François Ibou Cissé (born 2 November 1996) is a French professional footballer who plays as a midfielder for AS Beauvais Oise.

Professional career
Cissé is a youth product of the academy of Paris FC, and in the 2016–17 season represented the senior team in the Championnat National. He made his professional debut for the club in a 2–0 Coupe de la Ligue loss to Clermont Foot on 22 August 2017.

Personal life
Born in France, Cissé is of Malian descent.

References

External links
 
 
 

1996 births
Living people
People from Massy, Essonne
Footballers from Essonne
Association football midfielders
French footballers
French sportspeople of Malian descent
Paris FC players
AS Beauvais Oise players
Ligue 2 players
Championnat National players
Championnat National 3 players